Kim Dong-won is a Korean name consisting of the family name Kim and the given name Dong-won, and may also refer to:

 Kim Dong-won (filmmaker, born 1955) (born 1955), South Korean filmmaker
 Kim Dong-won (director, born 1962) (born 1962), South Korean film director